Huang Kun (September 2, 1919 – July 6, 2005) was a Chinese physicist and an academician of the Chinese Academy of Sciences. He was awarded the State Preeminent Science and Technology Award (the highest science award in China) by President Jiang Zemin in 2001.

Born in Beijing, China, in 1919, Huang graduated from Yenching University with a degree in physics. In 1948, he earned his PhD from the H. H. Wills Physics Lab of Bristol University in England and continued his postdoctoral studies at Liverpool University, where he coauthored the book Dynamical Theory of Crystal Lattices with Max Born between 1949 and 1951.

In 1951, Huang returned to China to teach, and became a professor of physics at Peking University. In 1955, he became a founding member of the Chinese Academy of Sciences (CAS). After his retirement in 1983, Huang remained active in the research of semiconductors and was selected as the chairman of the Chinese Society of Physics between 1987 and 1991. He served as Director of the Institute of Semiconductors of the CAS. 

Huang made many founding contributions to the field of solid-state physics. His Dynamical Theory of Crystal Lattices, which was a result of his collaboration with German Nobel laureate Max Born, has become a classic work of modern physics. The Born–Huang approximation is named after them.

References 

1919 births
2005 deaths
Alumni of the University of Bristol
Educators from Beijing
Members of the Chinese Academy of Sciences
Academic staff of Peking University
Physicists from Beijing
Yenching University alumni
Chinese expatriates in the United Kingdom
Members of the Royal Swedish Academy of Sciences